Robert Tinnell is an American writer, film director and producer.

Robert directed such films as Feast of the Seven Fishes (2019), Frankenstein and Me (1996), and Kids of the Round Table (1995). His producer credits include Back Fork (2019), The Hunted (2013) and Surf Nazis Must Die (1987).

His graphic novel writing includes Flesh and Blood, The Living and The Dead, The Black Forest, The Wicked West, and the Eisner Award Nominee Feast of the Seven Fishes.

Biography
Tinnell's work as a director includes the films Kids of the Round Table (1995), Believe (2000), and Frankenstein and Me (1996), the latter of which was very popular with fans of classic horror. Tinnell has frequently acknowledged his passion for horror, particularly classic horror films. Hammer Film Productions aficionados seek out Frankenstein and Me because of a sequence inspired by the 1960 Terence Fisher film Brides of Dracula, which starred Peter Cushing. Tinnell's film actually recreates a windmill set that is used in the Hammer film. In the same film, Tinnell meticulously recreated a scene reminiscent of Night of the Living Dead as well as other horror classics. All of the sequences featured children in the adult roles. Burt Reynolds and Louise Fletcher starred in Frankenstein and Me, alongside a young Ryan Gosling. (Stars Elisha Cuthbert and Gosling both had early film roles for Tinnell.)

As a producer, Tinnell worked in both the music video world as well as feature films.  Among his credits as producer are the MTV Award-winning Paula Abdul music video "Straight Up," directed by David Fincher, and the notorious cult film Surf Nazis Must Die (released through Troma).

Tinnell is best known in comics for a series of horror graphic novels, including The Black Forest, The Wicked West, The Living and The Dead, and Sight Unseen.  His book Feast of the Seven Fishes was nominated for an Eisner Award for Best Graphic Album – Reprint. While promoting Feast of the Seven Fishes, Tinnell was a guest on several popular radio cooking shows, including The Splendid Table with Lynne Rossetto Kasper, the Rocco Dispirito Show, and KCRW's Good Food.

Personal life
Tinnell is the brother of film producer and graphic novel publisher Jeffrey Tinnell. Robert lives in West Virginia with his wife, Shannon, and two children, Isabella and Jack.

Awards
 Tinnell received the Best Director Award from Europe's prestigious Fantasporto Film Festival for Frankenstein and Me.
 Tinnell's directorial debut, Kids of the Round Table, was nominated for a Cable ACE Award. The film, which starred Malcolm McDowell, dealt with a young boy who discovers Excalibur, the legendary sword of King Arthur.
 The Black Forest won the Rondo Hatton Classic Horror Awards for Best Horror Comic of 2004, and in 2005 The Black Forest 2 won the award again.
 Rue Morgue Magazine selected Sight Unseen as best horror comic of 2006.

Bibliography
The Black Forest (co-scripted with Todd Livingston, with art by Neil Vokes, Image Comics, 2004)
The Wicked West (co-scripted with Todd Livingston, with art Neil Vokes, Image Comics, 2004)
The Faceless: A Terry Sharp Story (with art by Adrian Salmon, Image Comics, 2005)
The Living and the Dead (co-scripted with Todd Livingston, with art by Micah Farritor, Speakeasy Comics, 2005)
Feast of the Seven Fishes (writer/art by Ed Piskor and Alex Saviuk, Allegheny Image Factory, 2005)
Sight Unseen (co-created with artist Bo Hampton, Image Comics, 2006)
The Wicked West 2: Abomination and other tales (numerous contributors, Image Comics, 2006)
Kids of the Round Table (co-wrote with Aaron J. Shelton, with art by Brendon Fraim and Brian Fraim, Action Lab Comics, 2015) based on the film of the same name.

References

External links
 Robert Tinnell's Feast of the Seven Fishes Blog
Shades of Gray site (Robert Tinnell, producer)

Living people
People from Fairmont, West Virginia
American film producers
Film directors from West Virginia
1961 births